In a motion picture, television program or video game, the opening credits or opening titles are shown at the very beginning and list the most important members of the production. They are now usually shown as text superimposed on a blank screen or static pictures, or sometimes on top of action in the show. There may or may not be accompanying music. When opening credits are built into a separate sequence of their own, the correct term is a title sequence (such as the familiar James Bond and Pink Panther title sequences).

Opening credits since the early 1980s, if present at all, identify the major actors and crew, while the closing credits list an extensive cast and production crew. Historically, however, opening credits have been the only source of crew credits and, largely, the cast, although over time the tendency to repeat the cast, and perhaps add a few players, with their roles identified (as was not always the case in the opening credits), evolved. The ascendancy of television movies after 1964 and the increasingly short "shelf-life" of films in theaters has largely contributed to the credits convention which came with television programs from the beginning, of holding the vast majority of cast and crew information for display at the end of the show.

In movies and television, the title and opening credits may be preceded by a "cold open," or teaser (in other words, a brief scene prior to the main acts), that helps to set the stage for the episode or film.

History
 
Up until the 1970s, closing credits for films usually listed only a reprise of the cast members with their roles identified, or even simply just said "The End," requiring opening credits to normally contain the details. For instance, the title sequence of the 1968 film Oliver! runs for about three-and-a-half minutes, and while not listing the complete cast, does list nearly all of its technical credits at the beginning of the film, all set against a background of what appear to be, but in fact are not, authentic 19th-century engravings of typical London life. The only credit at film's end is a listing of most of the cast, including cast members not listed at the beginning. These are set against a replay of some of the "'Consider Yourself" sequence.

Some opening credits are presented over the opening sequences of a film, rather than in a separate title sequence. The opening credits for the 1993 film The Fugitive continued intermittently over several opening scenes, and did not finish until fifteen minutes into the film. The opening credits for the 1968 film Once Upon a Time in the West lasted for fourteen minutes.

The first sound film to begin without any opening credits was Walt Disney's Fantasia, released in 1940. In the film's general release, a title card and the credit "Color by Technicolor" were spliced onto the beginning of the film, but otherwise there were no credits, although closing credits were added to the 1990 re-release and are on the videocassette. This general release version has been the one most often seen by audiences. In the roadshow version of the film, unseen by most audiences until its DVD release, the title card is seen only at the halfway point of the film, as a cue that the intermission is about to begin. The intermission was omitted in the general release version.

Orson Welles' Citizen Kane begins with only a title credit. This practice was extremely uncommon during that era.

West Side Story (1961) begins with a shot of an ink sketch of the New York City skyline as it was when the film was made. As the background of the shot changes color several times, we hear an overture medley (not in the original show) of some of the film's songs. As the overture ends, the camera pulls back and we see the title of the film. The rest of the credits are shown as graffiti at the end.

Most Disney films released between 1937 and 1981 had all the film-related information in the opening credits, while the closing consisted only of the credit "The End: A Walt Disney Production". However, Mary Poppins was the first Disney film to have longer closing credits, in which all the principal cast members (and the characters that they played) were listed.

Most Soviet films presented all film-related information in the opening credits, rather than at the closing which consisted of only a "THE END" (Konyets Fily-ma) title. A typical Soviet opening credits sequence starts with a film company's logo (such as Mosfilm or Lenfilm), the film's title, followed by the scenarist (the Soviet Union considered the scriptwriter the principal "auteur" of its films), followed by the director, usually on separate screens, then continuing with screens showing other credits, of varying number, and finally, the film's chief administrator-in-charge, the production director (Direktor kartiny). Following this came the cast, usually in actor-and-role format for all principal and major featured players, and perhaps then a screen only naming, in an alphabetical cluster, some additional character players. The final credit screen identified the studio corresponding to the logo at the beginning, and the year of the film's production. It could also contain the frame with the technical information about the cinematographic film manufacturer (e.g., Svema).

This basic method was also followed in most American films from the 1930s through the late 1980s. American films also tended to list the names of the actors before the names of the directors, screenwriters, and other principal crew members. Exceptions were made in the films of director Frank Capra, whose name was usually billed before the film's title. Director Victor Fleming's name was also billed before those of the actors in films such as The Wizard of Oz, Dr. Jekyll and Mr. Hyde and Joan of Arc. Capra, Fleming, and James Whale were some of the few directors who received the credit "A [director's name] Production" even though they did not produce their films.

François Truffaut's 1966 film Fahrenheit 451 uses spoken opening credits instead of written ones, in keeping with the film's story of a world without reading matter, as well as Jean-Luc Godard's Contempt of 1963.

Trends of the 2000s
Many major American motion pictures have done away with opening credits, with many films, such as Van Helsing in 2004 and Batman Begins in 2005, not even displaying the film title until the closing credits begin.

George Lucas is credited with popularizing this with his Star Wars films which display only the film's title at the start. His decision to omit opening credits in his films Star Wars (1977) and The Empire Strikes Back (1980) led him to resign from the Directors Guild of America after being fined $250,000 for not crediting the director during the opening title sequence. However, Hollywood had been releasing films without opening credits for many years before Lucas came along, most notably Citizen Kane, West Side Story, 2001: A Space Odyssey and The Godfather.

Nevertheless, "title-only" billing became an established form for summer blockbusters in 1989, with Ghostbusters II, Lethal Weapon 2 and The Abyss following the practice. Clint Eastwood has omitted opening credits (except for the title) in every film that he has directed since approximately 1982.

Credit only
With regard to television series, it is now an accepted practice to credit regular cast members for every episode of a season, even if they did not appear in each episode. One example is the American television series Nip/Tuck, in which the appearance of all credited characters is rare. Another television series that credited all regulars for a season in every episode (regardless of whether or not they appeared) was Lost, most notably from season two onward, in which the complete credited cast appeared in only two episodes out of 23. During Losts fourth season, Harold Perrineau was credited for all thirteen episodes, despite only having appeared in five of them (fewer than some guest stars, such as Jeff Fahey).

The series Charmed also began by crediting every regular cast member even if they did not appear in the episode. The season two episode "Morality Bites" is the only episode in which only the three leading actresses were credited, and later the male cast members were only credited in the episodes in which they appeared. If a regular actor was not featured in that particular episode, the opening credits were edited with their images omitted and the actors not being credited.

The television series Police Squad!, in keeping with its parodic nature, featured a character who only appeared in the credits ("...and Rex Hamilton as Abraham Lincoln").

Soap operas
Traditionally, actors in daytime soap operas are not credited in the episode opening sequences; this has been the case because of the escapist tone of the soap opera genre and as such, producers of soaps did not want cast members credited in the opening sequence in order to keep this intact. The drawback to this is that cast members are often identified by fans as their soap opera personas and not as themselves, as opposed to actors on other television programs who, in many cases, were identifiable by their own name.

In the 2000s, some soap operas began using an opening sequence where the actors are credited. The Young and the Restless was the first such show to credit, at least, most of the actors on contract with the series. The Bold and the Beautiful, which is produced by Bell-Phillip Television Productions (a subsidiary of Y&R producer Bell Dramatic Serial Company), began crediting all contract cast members in its opening titles in 2004, four years after The Young and the Restless implemented it (however, unlike Y&R, The Bold and the Beautiful cycles between different title sequences depending on the episode's running time: two that feature credits – including one shorter sequence – and one that does not feature any credits or cast member visuals). ABC Daytime soaps began implementing the process in October 2002 with the debut of the All My Children 'Scrapbook" opening used until May 2004. One Life to Live began featuring character credits within the title sequence during the same time period with its "Blue and White" opening. The most recent soap to include credits for all contract actors in its opening titles was General Hospital after a February 2010 revamp of its opening credits (a credit-less introduction resumed in 2012 with the introduction of a shorter title sequence), though during the final years of its "Faces of the Heart" sequence from April 2003 to September 2004, the names of the main characters were shown alongside video headshots of the cast members in the opening title sequence.

Often, only the Friday episode of a daytime serial would run closing credits listing the actors. All performers from the preceding five episodes would be listed. Starting in the 2000s, complete end credits began running more frequently. Days of Our Lives in particular currently credits all actors, those on contract, on recurring status and with guest starring roles on the show that week, alternating every other episode with a closing credit sequence showing the program's crew members; in either instance, either version is shown after the producer, director and writing credits (General Hospital, The Young and the Restless and The Bold and the Beautiful credit all performers during their closing credits, although the latter two only credit recurring and guest cast members are credited for their appearance that week only and General Hospital mainly credits only main and recurring cast members).

British soaps have never credited cast members or crew members in their opening titles nor do they show video or images of the cast members. However, in recent years these programmes have listed the writers, producers and directors over the first scene of the episode and episode titles if they apply. The opening titles of Hollyoaks feature regular characters in short (less than one second) scenes intended to capture their character.

Common opening credits order

While there are numerous variations most opening credits use some variation of the basic order. In the absence of opening credits, these roles will often be credited in reverse order at the beginning of the closing credits.

 (NAME OF THE STUDIO) or (NAME OF THE STUDIO) PRESENTS
 Name of the studio that is distributing the film and may or may not have produced it (for example, the major film studios like Walt Disney Pictures, Universal Pictures, or Warner Bros.)

 (NAME OF THE PRODUCTION COMPANY)
 Name of the production company that actually made the film or name of the investment groups or companies that financed a substantial part of the film (usually credited as "in association with" or "A [production company name] production.").

 POSSESSORY CREDIT/S
 The primary artistic credit for the film. Generally the film director, but sometimes the producer or writer. Normally stylized "A film by [name]" or "A [name] film". Sometimes placed before a title. (E.g. "Alfred Hitchcock's Psycho").

 STARRING
 Principal actors (sometimes the stars' and director's credits will be reversed, depending on the star's deal with the studio; in other cases, as in the Rodgers and Hammerstein films, or as in all three film versions of Show Boat, or, as in many Disney films, the title of the film will be shown before the names of the production company, its possessory credit, and its actors; sometimes, as in many of Cannon's films, the name(s) of the principal actor(s) will be shown before the name(s) of the producer(s), i.e. "The Cannon Group presents X in a Golan-Globus production of a Y film").

 (FILM'S TITLE)
 Name of the film.

 FEATURING or WITH or AND or ALSO STARRING
 Featured actors.

As a variation some of the below may be noted:

 GOWNS (older movies)
 SOUND RECORDING (older movies)

 CASTING or CASTING BY
 Casting director. Those who are members of the Casting Society of America will have the post-nominal letters "CSA" after their name.

 MUSIC or MUSIC COMPOSED BY or ORIGINAL SCORE BY
 Composer of music.

 VISUAL EFFECTS PRODUCER or VISUAL EFFECTS SUPERVISOR
 VFX Studio

 COSTUME DESIGN or COSTUME DESIGNER
 Costume designer.

 EDITOR or EDITED BY
 Film Editor. Those who are members of the American Cinema Editors will have the post-nominal letters "ACE" after their name.

 PRODUCTION DESIGN or PRODUCTION DESIGNER
 Production designer.

 DIRECTOR OF PHOTOGRAPHY
 Director of photography.
 Members of the following societies will have post-nominal letters after their name:
 American Society of Cinematographers: ASC
 British Society of Cinematographers: BSC

 PRODUCER or PRODUCED BY, EXECUTIVE PRODUCER
 Producers, co-producers, executive producers, 'also produced by' (credited for various reasons according to contracts and personal scrutiny of the principal producer). Often, though, the name of the producer will be the second-to-last opening credit, just before the writer's name(s) are shown (Pursuant to WGA rules, writer credits are immediately adjacent to the Director.).

Those who have been certified by the Producers Guild of America that they actually performed a major portion of the producing duties of the film will have the "Producers Mark" certification mark--the post-nominal letters "p.g.a."--after their names.

 BASED ON THE BOOK (PLAY, GRAPHIC NOVEL etc.) BY or FROM A PLAY/BOOK BY (older movies)
 If based on a book or other literary work.

 BASED ON THE CHARACTERS BY or BASED ON THE CHARACTERS CREATED BY
 If based on characters from a book or other media.

 (SCREEN) STORY or STORY BY
 Person who wrote the story on which the script is based, gets "story by" credit, and the first screenplay credit, unless the script made substantial changes to the story.

 WRITER(S) or WRITTEN BY or SCREENPLAY or SCREENPLAY BY
 Screenplay writers. The Writers Guild of America allows only three writing credits on a feature film, although teams of two are credited as one, separated on the credits by an ampersand ("X & Y"). If each works independently on the script (the most common system), they are separated by an "and". If more than two persons worked on the screenplay, the credits may read something like "screenplay by X & Y and Z and W," meaning that X and Y worked as a team, but Z and W worked separately.

 DIRECTOR or DIRECTED BY
 Director. The Directors Guild of America usually permits a film to list only one director, even when it is known that two or more worked on it. Exceptions are made in rare cases such as a death and subsequent replacement of the director mid-production as well as for established directing teams such as the Coen brothers.

See also
 Acknowledgment (creative arts)
 Broadcast designer
 Character generator
 Closing credits
 Credit (creative arts)
 Digital on-screen graphic (BUG)
 Lower third
 Production logo
 Title sequence
 Cinema Research Corporation

References

External links
  – A compendium and leading web resource of film and television title design from around the world, including interviews and behind-the-scenes materials.
  – A collection of title sequences and interviews with designers.
 
 

Film and television opening sequences
Articles containing video clips
Film and video technology
Television terminology